The Strynzelbach is a stream that begins near Herrenmühle on the Herrenmühlengraben in the borough of Ziesar in the German district of Potsdam-Mittelmark. It drains northwards into the river Buckau.

References

External links 

Potsdam-Mittelmark